Argoed (meaning: wooded area or in the wood) is a community in Flintshire, Wales, located between the towns of Mold and Buckley. The largest settlement in the community is Mynydd Isa, with New Brighton and Mynydd bychan to the north and Llong on the southern border of the community.

Religion: There are 3 churches:- St.Cecilia's, Mynydd Isa, built 1842; St.James Church built 1893 and Village Temple Congregational Church founded in 1912.

There are two schools:- Argoed High School and Ysgol Mynydd Isa.

Library:- Mynydd Isa Library

Places of Interest nearby:
Bronwylfa Park, Pen-y Lon, Mynydd Isa Park & Garden CH7 6YG
13.5 miles - Erddig, atmospheric 1,200 acre County Park and formal walled garden.
15.2 miles - Speke Hall Garden and Estate, featuring Black & White Tudor house.
18.4 miles - Chirk Castle, magnificent Medieval fortress of The Welsh Marches.

Population: 874 increasing at the 2011 census following reorganisation to 5837.

Number of houses in Argoed (2001): 179 increasing to 2,405 in 2011.

Governance
An Argoed electoral ward exists, though this only covers the southern part of the community. The northern part of the community forms the New Brighton electoral ward.
 
The population of the Argoed ward at the 2011 census was 2,836.

References

Communities in Flintshire
Wards of Flintshire